is a four-week anime television special series featuring an original story by Nakaba Suzuki. The series was confirmed on September 27, 2015 and began airing on August 28, 2016 on MBS and TBS. The special has also been licensed by Netflix and was released on February 17, 2017. The special was produced by A-1 Pictures, directed by Tomokazu Tokoro, and written by Yuniko Ayana and Yuichiro Kido, featuring character designs by Keigo Sasaki. The music was composed by Hiroyuki Sawano and Takafumi Wada. A commercial following the final episode confirmed a second anime series has been green-lit.



Episode list

References

External links
Official page at Weekly Shōnen Magazine
Official anime website
 (anime) at Netflix
Official video game website

2016 Japanese television seasons
1.5
Seven deadly sins in popular culture